This is a list of radio stations with the name Star.

In North America
CKSR-FM (98.3 Star FM) in Chilliwack, British Columbia, Canada
KIOI (FM) (Star 101.3) in San Francisco, California, United States
KMYI (Star 94.1) in San Diego, California, US
KPLZ-FM (Star 101.5) in Seattle, Washington, US
KSRZ (Star 104.5) in Omaha, Nebraska, US
KSTZ (Star 102.5) in Des Moines, Iowa, US
WAHR (Star 99.1) in Huntsville, Alabama, US
WAWZ (Star 99.1) in Zarephath, New Jersey, US
WBZZ (Star 100.7) in Pittsburgh, Pennsylvania, US
WIOZ-FM (Star 102.5) in Southern Pines, North Carolina, US
WMSR-FM (Star 94) in Muscle Shoals, Alabama, US
WRTS (Star 104) in Erie, Pennsylvania, US
WSSR (Star 96-7) in Joliet, Illinois, US
WSSV (Saratoga's Star Radio) in Saratoga Springs, New York, US
WSTR (FM) (Star 94) in Atlanta, Georgia, US
WTSS (Star 102.5) in Buffalo, New York, US
WWST (Star 102.1) in Knoxville, Tennessee, US
WZSR (Star 105.5) in McHenry County, Illinois, US

In the UK
Current Stations:
Star Radio in Cambridge and Ely
Closed Stations:
Star 107.9 in Stroud

Elsewhere
STAR radio in Liberia
Star (New Zealand), a New Zealand radio network
 Star FM (Australia), a former radio network in Australia
 Star FM (Kenya), a Somali-language radio station
 Star FM (Philippines), a radio network in the Philippines
 Star FM (South Africa), a radio station in Klerksdorp, South Africa
 Star FM Zimbabwe, a national radio station in Zimbabwe

Star